The Timiș or Timișul Sec is a right tributary of the river Ghimbășel in Romania. Its source is in the Piatra Mare Mountains, northeast of Predeal. It discharges into the Ghimbășel in Sânpetru. It flows through the eastern part of the city Brașov. Part of its water is diverted towards the Timiș Canal.

Tributaries

The following rivers are tributaries to the river Timiș:

Left: Vlădeț, Valea Calului, Valea Postăvaru, Valea Dragă, Lamba Mare, Vama Mare, Varna Mare, Larga Mare
Right: Timișul Sec de Jos, Valea Carierei, Valea Pietrei Mari, Valea Dracului, Șipoaia

References

Rivers of Romania
Rivers of Brașov County